Mount Abbott is a mountain in British Columbia, Canada, located within Glacier National Park. The peak is west of the Asulkan Creek drainage, near Rogers Pass.  It is named for Harry Braithwaite Abbott, a superintendent of the Canadian Pacific Railway. The first ascent was made by William Spotswood Green and Henry Swanzy in 1888.  The route is a relatively easy scramble.

References

Two-thousanders of British Columbia
Selkirk Mountains
Glacier National Park (Canada)
Kootenay Land District